Taqi Arani (September 5, 1903 – February 4, 1940), was a professor of chemistry, left-wing Iranian political activist, and the founder and editor of the Marxist magazine Donya (The World).

Biography
Arani was born in Tabriz and moved to Tehran with his family when he was four years old. In 1920, he graduated from Dar ul-Funun School in Tehran and pursued his studies in Germany studying chemistry at Berlin Institute of Technology. While studying in Germany, he began to study politics as well. Upon finishing his studies, he returned to Iran in 1928 and started Donya magazine. Many people consider Donya as his most important contribution to modern intellectual life in Iran. In 1938, he and 52 of his colleagues, The Fifty-Three, were arrested and charged with being involved in communist activities. He died (or as some claim, was killed) in jail in February 1940.

Members of the Fifty-Three would go on to found the Tudeh Party in 1941, often considered the beginning of the modern Communist party in Iran.

Views
Although an important figure in the history of Iran's Marxist Left, Arani held strong Iranian nationalist and chauvinistic leanings and wrote on the Iranian character of Iran's Azerbaijan region in response to pan-Turkist groups in Turkey of the 1920s. He also argued that the state should be reestablished based on the principles of the Sassanian state and that Zoroastrianism should be the religion of this state.

References

Further reading

External links

20th-century Iranian politicians
1903 births
1940 deaths
Iranian activists
Iranian communists
Iranian magazine founders
Iranian people who died in prison custody
Iranian prisoners and detainees
Magazine publishers (people)
Politicians from Tabriz